Las Flores Airport is a rural airport serving Las Flores, a town in the Buenos Aires Province of Argentina.

There is a major highway intersection close to the north corner of the airport. Runway 02/20 length includes a  displaced threshold on Runway 20.

See also

Transport in Argentina
List of airports in Argentina

References

External links 
OpenStreetMap - Las Flores

Airports in Argentina
Buenos Aires Province